Billy Joe Hobert (born January 8, 1971) is a former professional American football quarterback; he played nine seasons in the  National Football League with four teams, primarily as a reserve.

College career
While at the University of Washington, Hobert led the Huskies to a national championship in 1991, during his redshirt sophomore season.  He was elevated to the starting position after junior Mark Brunell suffered a serious knee injury during spring drills, causing him to miss most of the 1991 season. During the 1991 season, Hobert was 173/285 on completions for 2,271 yards with 22 touchdowns versus 10 interceptions, with 56 yards rushing and 5 touchdowns.

After the success of the 1991 season, Hobert became implicated in a major NCAA scandal.

This cost Hobert his college eligibility, and was an aggravating factor in the university receiving Pacific-10 Conference sanctions for lack of institutional control; it led to head coach Don James resigning in protest in August 1993 over a two-year bowl ban. Although several other Huskies players were implicated in improprieties, Hobert became the most well-known face of the sanctions, leading to him receiving death threats.

Professional career
Hobert was the 58th pick in the 1993 NFL Draft, selected in the third round by the Los Angeles Raiders, sixty picks ahead of fellow Husky quarterback Brunell. He was the third quarterback selected in the draft, behind the top two overall picks, Drew Bledsoe and Rick Mirer. Hobert was also selected in the sixteenth round (453rd overall) of the 1993 baseball draft by the Chicago White Sox, but chose to pursue a career in the NFL.

Hobert was a back-up quarterback for four seasons with the Raiders, then went on to play for the Buffalo Bills in 1997. He was initially expected to compete with Alex Van Pelt and Todd Collins for the starting quarterback position made vacant by Jim Kelly's retirement; however, after a notorious incident in Buffalo where he publicly admitted that he was unprepared to play, he was promptly released in mid-October. Hobert was acquired later that season by the New Orleans Saints, where he remained through 1999; he signed with the Indianapolis Colts in 2000. While on the Colts roster for two years, he did not play a snap during the regular season.

Personal life
Hobert grew up in Orting, Washington.  

Hobert has five children.  Hobert became a born again Christian during the Saints pre-season camp in 1998.

References

External links

1971 births
Living people
American football quarterbacks
Buffalo Bills players
Indianapolis Colts players
Los Angeles Raiders players
New Orleans Saints players
Oakland Raiders players
Washington Huskies football players
Sportspeople from Puyallup, Washington
Players of American football from Washington (state)
Baseball players from Washington (state)
Gulf Coast White Sox players
People from Orting, Washington